WDSP (1280 AM) is licensed to DeFuniak Springs, Florida, United States, the station serves the Walton County, area, playing a commercial-free format of independent music. The station is currently owned by The SportzMax, Inc.

History
WDSP was founded in 1956 by W.D. "Cooter" Douglass and his wife, Marie. After spending several years broadcasting as WGTX, the station was reassigned the WDSP call letters by the Federal Communications Commission on February 25, 2006.

LaVernie (Vern) Foster Jr., was hired by Mr. & Mrs. Douglas as manager of WDSP in 1957. The studios were at 30 South 8th Street, the current location of Peck Cawthon Insurance Agency.

After serving in World War II in the United States Army Air Corps, in the Chemical Corps, Vern Foster attended Trade School in Gadsden, Alabama where he received his certification in Broadcast Radio. He initially worked at WELR in Roanoke, Alabama as an announcer and technician.

After moving to Florida to manage WDSP, Vern Foster became an avid golfer and was the Club Champion at the DeFuniak Springs Golf Course on more than one occasion. He was also an accomplished fisherman, hunter and marksman.

During the cold war and threat of nuclear attack from the U.S.S.R. in the early 1960s Vern oversaw the construction of a bomb shelter/civil defense broadcast center, which was located in the back yard of his residence where the transmitter and tower for WDSP was located at the intersection of South 2nd Street and Bruce Avenue.

Vern Foster died in a single car crash on February 19, 1966 near the Forestry Service Fire Watch Tower located on Highway 90 about 3 miles east of DeFuniak Springs. Not long after his death, the radio station changed ownership and the WDSP call sign was changed to WGTX.  The studio of WGTX was relocated to the bomb shelter facility in the late 1960s where it remained for years broadcasting as WGTX. The station was reassigned the WDSP callsign by the Federal Communications Commission on February 25, 2006.

WDSP is owned by Omni Broadcasting of Fort Walton Beach and is part of The Ticket Sports Network simulcasting WTKE 100.3 FM during AM & Pm drive.  It also broadcasts Tim Brando, Jim Rome, Paul Finebaum and Dan Patrick. It is also a Sporting News Radio affiliate.

References

External links

DSP
News and talk radio stations in the United States
Radio stations established in 1956
1956 establishments in Florida